Hilgard Junction State Recreation Area is a state park in Hilgard, Oregon, United States, administered by the Oregon Parks and Recreation Department. Located along the Grande Ronde River next to Interstate 84 at its intersection with Highway 244, the park has Full RV hook-up sites and tent camp sites with flush toilets and showers nearby.

The park takes its name from a nearby junction of the Union Pacific Railroad line that was named after E. W. Hilgard, former dean of the College of Agriculture of the University of California.

See also
 List of Oregon state parks

References

External links

 

State parks of Oregon
Parks in Union County, Oregon